Wilhelm Andreas "Willi" Boltze (24 July 1904 – 25 October 1937) was a German long-distance runner. He competed in the men's 5000 metres at the 1928 Summer Olympics. Boltze committed suicide in 1937.

References

External links
 

1904 births
1937 suicides
Athletes (track and field) at the 1928 Summer Olympics
German male long-distance runners
Olympic athletes of Germany
Athletes from Hamburg
Suicides in Germany
20th-century German people